Felipe de Salcedo was a  Spanish explorer who was a member of the López de Legazpi expedition to the Philippines in the 16th century. He accompanied his brother Juan de Salcedo and grandfather Miguel López de Legazpi in 1564 for their colonization of the East Indies and the Pacific. He commanded 1 ship, out of 5 fleets that sailed from Mexico to the Philippines.

See also
History of the Philippines

Spanish conquistadors
People of Spanish colonial Philippines
Colonial Mexico
16th-century Spanish people
16th-century explorers
Mexican people of Basque descent